is a Japanese manga artist. She is best known for her series Dorohedoro, which was formerly serialized in Monthly Ikki, but moved to Hibana after Ikki ceased publication, and later moved to Monthly Shōnen Sunday after Hibana ceased publication. It was formerly serialized in English on Viz Media's SigIKKI site.

Background
Q Hayashida was born in Tokyo, Japan. She made her manga debut with Maken X Another, an adaptation of the 1999 video game Maken X and was published in Monthly Magazine Z. During this time, she started her own series in Dorohedoro, and it is her longest work to date.

Works
 Maken X Another (1999–2001); re-edited and re-released in 2009 as Maken X Another Jack.
 Dorohedoro (2000–2018)
Huvahh (2011) oneshot and enemy designs for Shadows of the Damned.
Underground Underground (2012) oneshot inside 138°E artbook
Hanshin Tigers Sousetsu 80 Shuunen Kinen Zoukan (2015)
Dai Dark (2019–present)

References

External links
   (archived 2013-04-05)
 Official online store 
 

1977 births
Living people
Manga artists from Tokyo
People from Tokyo
Japanese female comics artists
Japanese illustrators
Japanese women illustrators